Herman Zomers (1912–1959) was an Indonesian football forward who played for Hercules Batavia and for the Dutch East Indies in the 1938 FIFA World Cup.

Personal life
Herman Zomers was married to Marie Berendsen.

References

External links
 

Indonesian footballers
Indonesia international footballers
Association football forwards
1938 FIFA World Cup players
1912 births
1959 deaths